Commitment  is an album by American singer Bobby Darin (credited as Bob Darin), released in 1969. It was released by Darin's own Direction label and did not chart.

Reception

Music critic Richie Unterberger wrote in his Allmusic review  "It's a pity... that the album wasn't too good. The backup playing is only functional and perfunctory in a generic late-'60s folk-country-rock fashion, and the songs are neither too melodic nor too incisive in their lyrics, even as Darin was obviously striving for meaning... In spite of its consistent sound and vision, in the context of Darin's entire career it's a curiosity, and not something he did nearly as well as he did pop, rock & roll, swing jazz, or standards."

Track listing 
All songs composed and arranged by Bobby Darin (credited as Bob Darin).

Side one
 "Me and Mr. Hohner" – 3:10
 "Sugar Man"  – 2:50
 "Sausalito (The Governors Song)" – 2:25
 "Song for a Dollar" – 2:45
 "Harvest" – 3:05

Side two
 "Distractions, Pt. 1" – 3:29
 "Water Color Canvas" – 3:25
 "Jive" – 2:02
 "Hey Magic Man" – 4:25
 "Light Blue" – 3:28

Personnel
Bobby Darin – vocals, harmonica, keyboards
Bill Aikins – piano
Tommy Amato, Larry Devers – drums
Berry Chapman, Dennis Quitman – bass guitar
Joey Lemon, Bubba Poythress – guitar
Technical
Brent Maher – engineer
Martin Singer - cover photography

References 

1969 albums
Bobby Darin albums